Pon ye gyi (also spelt pone yay gyi and pone ye gyi) is a fermented bean paste commonly used as a condiment or marinade in Burmese cuisine, especially in pork and fish dishes. Pon ye gyi is traditionally made from horse gram beans, alongside other beans. To prepare the paste, the seeds are boiled, pounded with salt and fermented for about 12 hours into a product similar to soya bean sauce, producing a viscous paste with a reddish brown colour. It is consumed as a side-dish all over Myanmar(2019). The towns of Bagan, Nyaung U and Sale, and Myingyan in the country's central dry zone are major producers of this product.

See also
Fermented bean paste

References

Burmese cuisine
Plant-based fermented foods